The Gorre & Daphetid model railroad was a notable HO scale layout built by John Whitby Allen in Monterey, California. The name is pronounced "gory & defeated".

The Gorre & Daphetid, also known as "The Gorre" or just "The G&D," was three successive model railroads. The first two small versions were built at Allen's home in Monterey. The final version of the G&D, which incorporated the earliest layout, was much larger and built over twenty years at his new 9 Cielo Vista Terrace home in Monterey, where he excavated part of the basement to build the railroad. Mr. Allen was a pioneer in the field of model railroading - as a professional photographer he had the artistic talent and attention to detail to create and document incredibly realistic scenes, and did so in numerous articles featured in Model Railroader, the NMRA's Scale Rails and Railroad Model Craftsman magazines. He developed a story of origin, including humor and numerous references to his friends in the model railroading and model railroading publishing industry. He designed and built numerous buildings and people.  The final layout is considered one of the greatest layouts of all time and has several fan websites and a devoted Yahoo discussion group.

The basement of the house was severely damaged by fire just ten days after John Allen suffered a fatal heart attack in January 1973. Most of the layout was destroyed in the fire, however one of the locomotives, No. 34 (a 4-10-0 that John kitbashed from parts), resided in the office of the late former Model Railroader magazine executive editor Andy Sperandeo. Sperandeo was a frequent visitor to the G&D, being stationed in California while serving in the United States Army.

The February 2020 issue of Model Railroader reported that 15 locomotives from the G&D were found in the home of NMRA past president Bob Dupont. The engines were stored in the attic until he passed on, and the locomotives were discovered by Rod Smith.  Rod sent the locomotives to Kenichi Matsumoto and recently restored G&D 10 which is in running condition at the NMRA exhibit at the California State Railroad Museum in Sacramento, California.

Kalmbach Publishing published several editions of a book entitled Model Railroading with John Allen written by Allen's longtime friend, Linn Westcott.

Allen was a professional photographer by trade. Numerous boxes of his slides and prints are in storage at Kalmbach Publishing's corporate building in Waukesha, Wisconsin. Some of the boxes were singed by the flames of the fire that destroyed the G&D, and the smell of smoke from the blaze still lingers when one opens a box for a look at unpublished photos of the G&D.

References
 Model Railroading With John Allen: The Story of the Fabulous HO Scale Gorre & Daphetid Railroad (Paperback) Linn H. Westcott Kalmbach Pub Co.(July 1981) 
 Model Railroading With John Allen: The Story of the Fabulous HO Scale Gorre & Daphetid Railroad (Paperback) Linn H. Westcott Kalmbach Pub Co.(1982) ASIN B0032AW8BE
 Model Railroading With John Allen: The Story of the Fabulous HO Scale Gorre & Daphetid Railroad (Hardcover) Linn H. Westcott Kalmbach Pub Co.(July 1996) 
 Model Railroading With John Allen: Expanded Edition (Hardcover) Linn H. Westcott Benchmark Publications (2011) ASIN B004L18IN0

Model railroads